Haydn Jones (8 May 1946 – 31 August 2010) was a Welsh professional footballer, who played as a defender. He made appearances in the English Football League with Wrexham in the 1960s.
His only goal for Wrexham was a 30-yard volley against Stockport. Haydn was also capped 4 times by Wales at U21 level and famously played against Northern Ireland, marking George Best. 
He also played for Caernarfon Town, Bangor City, Porthmadog, Pwllheli, Blaenau Ffestiniog Amateur, Rhyl and Bethesda Athletic, returning to Caernarfon Town at the end of his career to act as player-manager. Jones died of Motor Neurone Disease.

References

1946 births
2010 deaths
People from Caernarfon
Sportspeople from Gwynedd
Welsh footballers
Association football defenders
English Football League players
Caernarfon Town F.C. players
Wrexham A.F.C. players
Bangor City F.C. players
Porthmadog F.C. players
Pwllheli F.C. players
Blaenau Ffestiniog Amateur F.C. players
Rhyl F.C. players
Bethesda Athletic F.C. players
Caernarfon Town F.C. managers
Welsh football managers